Utricularia huntii is a medium-sized perennial terrestrial carnivorous plant that belongs to the genus Utricularia. U. huntii is endemic to Brazil and is only known from five collections. It was originally described by Peter Taylor in 1986 in honor of David Richard Hunt.

See also 
 List of Utricularia species

References 

Carnivorous plants of South America
Flora of Brazil
huntii